Satyrium calanus, the banded hairstreak, is a butterfly in the family Lycaenidae.

Appearance, behavior, and distribution
The banded hairstreak is a common hairstreak east of the Rocky Mountains in North America. It is a territorial butterfly that will challenge other butterflies invading its territory.

Subspecies
Listed alphabetically:
S. c. albidus Scott, 1981
S. c. calanus
S. c. falacer (Godart, [1824])
S. c. godarti (Field, 1938)

Life cycle
Eggs are laid singly on the host plants and hatch in the spring. There is a single brood that flies early June to late August.

Host plants
Host plants include oak, hickory, and walnut (especially butternut).

Similar species
 Edwards' hairstreak (S. edwardsii)
 Hickory hairstreak (S. caryaevorum)

References

External links

Banded hairstreak, Butterflies of Canada

Satyrium (butterfly)
Butterflies of North America
Butterflies described in 1809